The Jeju Cup is the championship trophy awarded biannually to the winning team of the Jeju Cup Summer Classic and Jeju Cup Winter Classic ball hockey tournaments on Jeju Island, South Korea. Both tournaments are hosted by the Jeju Islanders Hockey Club, and played at the Jeju City inline skating rink.

Every time the trophy is won, a new plate is added, engraved with each player's name from the winning team. The trophy began with only one tier below the cup, but two additional tiers were added in July 2016 to accommodate more championship plates.

The Jeju Cup was first awarded to the Jungmun Jets at the inaugural Summer Classic tournament on July 13, 2014. The Jets beat the Gwakji Kings 3-1 in the tournament final. Later that year, the Cup was awarded to the Gwakji Kings at the inaugural Winter Classic tournament on December 7, 2014. The Kings defeated the Samyang Sabres 7-0 in the final.

On May 30, 2015, the Samyang Sabres returned to the final and won the 2015 Jeju Cup Summer Classic, while the Soesokkak Oilers defeated the Hamdeok Blackhawks in the final of the 2015 Jeju Cup Winter Classic on December 13, 2015.

On May 22, 2016, the Gwakji Kings won their second Jeju Cup title at the 2016 Jeju Cup Summer Classic. On December 11, 2016, the Jungmun Jets also captured their second Jeju Cup title, defeating the Iho Hurricanes 3-1 in the final of the 2016 Jeju Cup Winter Classic.

On June 4, 2017, the Jungmun Jets won their third Jeju Cup title (and second consecutive championship), after defeating the Pyoseon Penguins 3-1 in the final of the 2017 Jeju Cup Summer Classic. On December 9, 2017, the Gwakji Kings won their third Jeju Cup title after defeating the Jungmun Jets 2-1 in the final of the 2017 Jeju Cup Winter Classic, stifling the Jets' opportunity at the first three-peat in Jeju Cup history.

On May 13, 2018, the Pyoseon Penguins won their first Jeju Cup title at the 2018 Jeju Cup Summer Classic, defeating the Jungmun Jets 3-1 in the final. On December 15, 2018 at the Winter Classic, the Jungmun Jets were again grounded in the final, this time by the Gwakji Kings in overtime.

On May 12, 2019, the Pyoseon Penguins won their second Jeju Cup title at the 2019 Jeju Cup Summer Classic.

On December 5, 2021, the Jungmun Jets won their fourth Jeju Cup title at the 2021 Jeju Cup Winter Classic after defeating the Gwakji Kings 3-0 in the tournament final. 

On May 20, 2022, the Gwakji Kings won their fifth Jeju Cup title at the 2022 Jeju Cup Summer Classic after defeating the Jungmun Jets 2-1 in the sixth game of a best of seven championship series. The Kings won the series four games to two. This was the first time the Jeju Cup was contested in this format.

Team championship history 

Ten teams have competed for the Jeju Cup, but only five have ever won it. The Gwakji Kings hold the record for most championship victories by a team with five.

Player championship history 

83 players have had their name engraved on the Jeju Cup. Twenty-one players have won multiple championships. Sean Pratt, Ty Riddick, Chris Salzwedel, Branko Belan and Jason Hiltz are the only five players to have won the trophy more than twice. Salwedel holds the record for most championships won by a player with four.

References 

2014 establishments in South Korea
Ball hockey
Street hockey
Sport in South Korea